The 2016–17 Rhode Island Rams women's basketball team represented the University of Rhode Island during the 2016–17 NCAA Division I women's basketball season. The Rams, led by third year head coach Daynia La-Force. The Rams were members of the Atlantic 10 Conference and play their home games at the Ryan Center. They finished the season 6–24, 2–14 in A-10 to finish in last place. They lost in the first round of the A-10 women's tournament to Saint Joseph's.

2016–17 media
All Rams home games and most non-televised conference road games televised were shown on the A-10 Digital Network.

Roster

Schedule

|-
!colspan=9 style="background:#75B2DD; color:#002b7f;"| Exhibition

|-
!colspan=9 style="background:#75B2DD; color:#002b7f;"| Non-conference regular season

|-
!colspan=9 style="background:#75B2DD; color:#002b7f;"| Atlantic 10 regular season

|-
!colspan=9 style="background:#75B2DD; color:#002B7F;"| Atlantic 10 Women's Tournament

Rankings
2016–17 NCAA Division I women's basketball rankings

See also
 2016–17 Rhode Island Rams men's basketball team

References

Rhode Island Rams women's basketball seasons
Rhode Island
Rhode
Rhode